Robert Sedgewick or Sedgwick may refer to:

Robert Sedgewick (computer scientist) (born 1946), American computer scientist and author
Robert Sedgewick (judge) (1848–1906), Justice of the Supreme Court of Canada
Robert Minturn Sedgwick, American football player; first-team All-American in 1920
Robert Sedgwick (c. 1590–1656),  American colonist
Robert Sedgwick (actor), American actor